Ricardo Jamal Allen (born December 18, 1991) is a former American football free safety and coach who is an offensive assistant for the Miami Dolphins of the National Football League (NFL). He was drafted by the Atlanta Falcons in the fifth round of the 2014 NFL Draft where he played 7 seasons before playing his final season with the Cincinnati Bengals. He played college football at Purdue.

Early years
Allen attended Mainland High School in Daytona Beach, Florida. Allen committed to Purdue University on October 16, 2009.

College career
As a freshman at Purdue in 2010, Allen recorded 73 total tackles, 3.5 tackles-for-loss, one sack, three interceptions, two pick-sixes, and seven passes defended. As a sophomore in 2011, he recorded 79 total tackles, three tackles-for-loss, three interceptions, one pick-six, one forced fumble, and seven passes defended. As a junior in 2012, Allen broke the Purdue record for interceptions for touchdowns. In total, he recorded 45 total tackles, four sacks, one tackle-for-loss, one pick six, and five passes defended. He was a second team All-Big Ten Conference selection. As a senior in 2013, he recorded 53 total tackles, four tackles-for-loss, one sack, six interceptions, three passes defended, and one forced fumble.

College statistics

Professional career

Atlanta Falcons

2014
The Atlanta Falcons selected Allen in the fifth round (147th overall) of the 2014 NFL Draft. Allen was the 18th cornerback selected in 2014.

On May 18, 2014, the Atlanta Falcons signed Allen to a four-year, $2.42 million contract that includes a signing bonus of $200,500.

Throughout training camp, he competed against Robert McClain, Josh Wilson, and Javier Arenas for the job as the starting nickelback. Throughout the preseason, he saw minimal playing time on defense. On August 28, 2014, Allen recorded four solo tackles and deflected his second pass of the preseason during a 24–14 victory at the Jacksonville Jaguars in the Falcons' fourth preseason game. On August 30, 2014, Allen was released by the Falcons as part of their final roster cuts. On September 2, 2014, the Falcons signed him to the practice squad and retained five cornerbacks on the active roster, including Desmond Trufant, Robert Alford, Josh Wilson, Robert McClain, and Javier Arenas.

On December 16, 2014, the Atlanta Falcons promoted Allen to the active roster after fellow defensive back Robert Alford was sent to injured reserve. He was inactive for the Falcons last two regular season games and did not record a stat during his rookie season.

2015
Entering organized team activities, the new Atlanta Falcons' coaching staff opted to move Allen from cornerback to safety. The change was due to the Falcons failing to secure a new free safety to replace Dwight Lowery and to give Allen a better opportunity to make the active roster. He competed for the job as the starting free safety against Charles Godfrey and Kemal Ishmael. Head coach Dan Quinn named Allen the starting free safety to begin the regular season, alongside strong safety William Moore.

He made his professional regular season debut and first career start in the Atlanta Falcons' season-opener against the Philadelphia Eagles and recorded a seven combined tackles, deflected a pass, and made his first career interception off a pass by Sam Bradford during their 26–24 win. In Week 3, Allen recorded seven solo tackles before leaving the Falcons' 39–28 victory against the Dallas Cowboys in the third quarter after sustaining a knee injury. He was inactive for their Week 4 victory against the Washington Redskins due to a sprained MCL. On November 1, 2015, Allen recorded six combined tackles and made his first career sack on quarterback Jameis Winston during the Falcons' 23–20 loss against the Tampa Bay Buccaneers. In Week 13, he collected a season-high eight solo tackles during a 23–19 loss at the Tampa Bay Buccaneers. He finished the  season with 68 combined tackles (59 solo), four pass deflections, three interceptions, and a sack in 15 games and 14 starts.

2016
On March 7, 2016, the Atlanta Falcons placed a one-year, $525,000 exclusive rights tender on Allen to secure him for the upcoming season.

Allen entered training camp slated as the starting free safety, but saw minor competition from Robenson Therezie for the role. Defensive coordinator Richard Smith named Allen the starting strong safety to begin the regular season, alongside strong safety Kemal Ishmael.

On October 23, 2016, Allen recorded a season-high eight combined tackles during a 33–30 loss to the San Diego Chargers. In Week 13, he tied his season-high of eight combined tackles in the Falcons' 29–28 loss to the Kansas City Chiefs. The following week, Allen made six combined tackles, broke up a pass, and intercepted a pass by quarterback Jared Goff during a 42–14 victory at the Los Angeles Rams. He finished the season with a career-high 90 combined tackles (61 solo), three pass deflections, and two interceptions in 16 games and 16 starts.

The Atlanta Falcons finished the 2016 season first in the NFC South with an 11–5 record, clinching a first round bye and home field advantage through the playoffs. On January 14, 2017, Allen started in his first career playoff game and assisted on two tackles, deflected a pass, and returned an interception by Russell Wilson for 45-yards during the Falcons' 36–20 NFC Divisional Round victory against the Seattle Seahawks. The following week, Allen collected five combined tackles, broke up a pass, and intercepted a pass by quarterback Aaron Rodgers in their 44–21 victory against the Green Bay Packers in the NFC Championship. On February 5, 2017, Allen made seven combined tackles in the Falcons' 34–28 overtime loss in Super Bowl LI to the New England Patriots. The Falcons' defense allowed 19 points in the fourth quarter and defensive coordinator Richard Smith was fired after the defense' collapse in the Super Bowl.

2017
On March 7, 2017, the Atlanta Falcons signed Allen to a one-year, $615,000 contract. Allen entered camp slated as the de facto starting free safety. Defensive coordinator Marquand Manuel officially named him the starter, alongside strong safety Keanu Neal, to begin the regular season.

On September 25, 2017, Allen recorded three combined tackles before leaving the Falcons' 30–26 victory at the Detroit Lions in the third quarter after suffering a concussion. He remained in concussion protocol and was inactive for their Week 4 loss to the Buffalo Bills. On December 3, 2017, Allen recorded a career-high ten combined tackles during a 14–9 loss to the Minnesota Vikings. In Week 17, he assisted on two tackles, deflected a pass, and intercepted a pass by Cam Newton in the Falcons' 22–10 victory against the Carolina Panthers. He finished the  season with 54 combined tackles (28 solo), two pass deflections, and an interception in 15 games and 15 starts.

The Atlanta Falcons earned a wildcard berth after finishing third in the NFC South with a 10–6 record. They went on to defeat the Los Angeles Rams 26–13 in the NFC Wildcard Game. On February 13, 2018, Allen recorded four solo tackles in the Falcons' 15–10 loss to the eventual Super Bowl LII Champions, the Philadelphia Eagles in the NFC Divisional Round.

2018
On March 12, 2018, the Atlanta Falcons placed a second-round restricted free agent tender on Allen. The tender was a one-year, $2.91 million deal that kept Allen under contract for the 2018 season. On August 6, 2018, Allen signed a three-year, $19.5 million contract extension with the Falcons, keeping him under contract through the 2021 season. In Week 3 against the New Orleans Saints, Allen suffered a torn Achilles tendon and was ruled out the rest of the season.

2019

In week 11 against the Carolina Panthers, Allen recorded his first interception of the season off Kyle Allen in the 29–3 win.
In week 17 against the Tampa Bay Buccaneers, Allen intercepted a pass thrown by Jameis Winston and returned it for 27 yards during the 28–22 overtime win.

2020
In Week 9 against the Denver Broncos, Allen recorded his first interception of the season off a pass thrown by Drew Lock during the 34–27 win. In Week 17 Allen's last game as a Falcons he recorded a pick off of Bucs QB Tom Brady in a loss.

The Falcons released Allen on February 18, 2021 after seven seasons.

Cincinnati Bengals
Allen signed a one-year contract with the Cincinnati Bengals on March 29, 2021. He was named the backup safety to Jessie Bates and Vonn Bell to start the season. He suffered a hand injury in Week 1 and was placed on injured reserve on September 15, 2021. He was activated on October 9. In his lone season with the Bengals, Allen made his second Super Bowl appearance when the Bengals played the Los Angeles Rams in Super Bowl LVI.

A week after playing in the Super Bowl, Allen announced his retirement after eight seasons in the NFL.

Coaching career
On March 3, 2022, Allen joined Mike McDaniel's inaugural Dolphins staff as a special teams assistant.

On March 10, 2023, it was announced that Allen would be an offensive assistant for the Miami Dolphins.

References

External links
 
Atlanta Falcons bio
 Purdue Boilermakers bio

1991 births
Living people
American football safeties
Atlanta Falcons players
Cincinnati Bengals players
Purdue Boilermakers football players
Players of American football from Florida
Sportspeople from Daytona Beach, Florida
Miami Dolphins coaches
Ed Block Courage Award recipients